FC Dynamo Saint Petersburg is a Russian football club from Saint Petersburg, in Northwest Russia. Founded in 1922, the club was one of the oldest in the city. It plays in the third-tier Russian Football National League 2.

They were a regular in the Soviet Top League until relegation in 1963. After the dissolution of the Soviet Union, their highest status was in the second-level Russian National Football League  for several seasons, and the fifth place in the league is their greatest achievement.

In July 2015, the club was purchased by Boris Rotenberg. In June 2018, the team moved to Sochi, becoming PFC Sochi; in Saint Petersburg there remained Dynamo youth team. In April 2019 Dynamo was reestablished by Clubs' Veterans on resources of FC LAZ Luga. Since August 2021, Chinese trucks manufacturer SAIC Iveco Hongyan is the main sponsor.

History

The glorious past
The club was founded in 1922 as part of the All-Union Sport Society "Dinamo" that had clubs in a variety of sports throughout the Soviet Union. The society was the main sponsor of the club. Dinamo debuted in the Soviet Top League in 1936 among the original seven teams in the first edition of the Soviet Top League. The club reentered the Soviet Top League following the end of World War II as the member of the interrupted edition of 1941. The club then participated in the Top League between 1936 and 1954, finishing in the top five, three times. In 1954, its record was cause to replace Dynamo with TRL after the team's tenth-place finish in the League. From 1955 to 1961, they had only Jewish striker, Israel "Zolik" Olshanetsky.

A resurrection
The club was resurrected in 1960 in the place of TRL and spent the next two seasons in "the second tier (Class B) of the Soviet league, before making it back to the Top Division.

Loss of professional status
Dynamo lost its professional status in 2000 with the lack of financing; a local building society stepped in. Professional status was lost in 2004.

FC Petrotrest Saint Petersburg

FC Petrotrest Saint Petersburg was a former association football club from Saint Petersburg, Russia, founded in 2001. In 2002 the team played in Amateur Football League (North-West zone), in 2003, 2004, 2006 and since 2011 - in Second Division (West zone), in 2005 - in First Division (was relegated).

From 2007 to 2010 the team played under the name of FC Dynamo Saint Petersburg. After the team was relegated to the Russian Second Division after the 2010 season, the team returned to their previous name FC Petrotrest and another independent team called FC Dynamo was organized to play in the Amateur Football League. In 2012 the club was finished in the 1st place and was promoted to the First division. In 2013 it was merged back into Dynamo Saint Petersburg.

The United FC Dynamo Saint Petersburg
In preparations to 2013–14 season, FC Petrotrest and Dynamo signed on an agreement of merging FC Petrotrest into Dynamo in order to play in the Russian First Division, now called the National Football League.

At the end of the 2014–15 season, the club was relegated to the third level league, the Russian Professional Football League. Following the season, the club was purchased by the billionaire Boris Rotenberg (technically, a new club called FC Dynamo-Saint Petersburg was formed, with SMP Racing becoming the new sponsor) and at the end of June 2015 "Dynamo" has with the new founders and sponsors were allowed to participate in the Second Division.

The first season of the renewed team was not easy - meeting in full strength only a few days before the start of the Championship, Dynamo failed to show good performances in the first round, once in the basement of the standings at the end of the first part of the season. But in spring 2016, thanks to high-quality training in the winter and breeding spot, Dynamo straighten their figures, nearly becoming the best team in the "West" zone on the results of matches of the second stage of the Championship. in November 2016 The team finish in the 1st place in the table standing of Western Zone in the 2nd Division. They secured the top spot in their PFL zone and promotion back to the Russian National Football League on 21 May 2017.

The move to Sochi

Since 2019
Dynamo Saint Petersburg was re-established on the base of another Saint Petersburg club, this time it was FC LAZ Luga in 2019, and they won the Champions Cup of North-West Championship.

In May 2020, it was reported that the club will be reorganize as a private football club to compete in the Russian Professional Football League during 2020–21 season. Former Zenit's goalkeeper, Vyacheslav Malafeev, was attached to manage the club.

Dynamo reentered PFL (which was renamed to FNL 2) for the 2021–22 season. In August 2021, a Chinese company SAIC Iveco Hongyan has become the main sponsor.

Current squad
As of 22 February 2023, according to the Second League website.

Team name history
 Dynamo Leningrad (1936–1990)
 FC Prometey-Dynamo St. Petersburg (1991–1995)
 FC Dynamo St. Petersburg (1995–1999)
 FC Dynamo-Stroyimpuls St. Petersburg (2000)
 FC Dynamo-SPb St. Petersburg (2001–2003)
 FC Dynamo St. Petersburg (2007–2010)
 FC Dynamo Saint Petersburg (2011)
 FC Dynamo St. Petersburg (2013–2018, 2019–)

Home Stadium

Dynamo Stadium

In 1929, Dinamo gained its own stadium, Dinamo.

The Dynamo Stadium was built and designed by the architects O. Lyalin and Y. Svirskiy. The stadium was located on Krestovsky Island in Leningrad and was the home stadium for Dynamo F.C., the stadium had a capacity of 500 fans.

On May 22, 1936, the stadium hosted 12,000 fans in the first ever game of the Soviet Championship. The game was between Dynamo Leningrad and Lokomotiv Moscow and finished with Lokomotiv winning 1:3. During the Siege of Leningrad, On May 31, 1942, the stadium host The Siege Game, between Dynamo Leningrad and the local football clubs.

Nowadays, the stadium is used as a training compound for Dynamo. In 2007 the Saint Petersburg City Administration announced a project to destroy the stadium and replace it with a housing building and a business center. In 2009 the compound become a full municipal property after the City Administration purchased the ground from Dynamo's owners.

Petrovsky Stadium
Since the end of the 2000s, Dinamo plays at Sport Complex Petrovsky in Saint Petersburg. The complex consists of two arenas (stadiums): the central sport arena (CSA) and the minor sport arena (MSA). Dinamo shares the complex with four other professional teams. In 2008 Zenit plays at CSA, the MSA is used by Dinamo, Zenit-2, Zenit-D, and Sever (Murmansk). The MSA provides 2,835 seats to its spectators. There are talks that Zenit will move out of this complex to its new stadium that will be built in 2009 in place of the Kirov Stadium. This migration might provide Dinamo with full exploitation of the whole complex.

League and cup history

Soviet Union

Russia

Farm club
Following Dynamo's promotion to the Russian National Football League at the end of the 2016–17 season, the club organized a farm-club FC Dynamo-2 Saint Petersburg and entered it into the Russian Professional Football League.

Notable players
These are players who won international caps for their respective countries. Players whose name is listed in bold represented their countries while playing for Dynamo.

USSR/Russia
 Sergey Dmitriev
 Pyotr Dementyev
 Alexander Kanishchev
 Aleksandr Khapsalis
 Nikolay Larionov
 Fridrikh Maryutin
/ Dmitri Radchenko
 Aleksandr Tenyagin
 Gennady Yevriuzhikin
 Anatoli Zinchenko
 Ilshat Faizulin
 Sergei Filippenkov

 Lyubomir Kantonistov
 Andrei Kondrashov
 Aleksandr Panov
 Roman Vorobyov
Former USSR countries
 Vyaçeslav Lıçkin
 Rizvan Umarov
 Dzmitry Aharodnik
 Alyaksandr Chayka
 Syarhyey Hyerasimets
 Andrei Lavrik
 Yuri Shukanov

 Andrey Yegorov
 Rimantas Žvingilas
 Andrei Mațiura
 Evgheni Hmaruc
 Serghei Rogaciov
 Oleg Shishkin
 Andrei Manannikov
 Oleksandr Kyryukhin
Europe
 Mark Švets
 Saša Ilić
Africa
 Brian Idowu

Coaches

Honours and Achievements
Soviet Top League:
 5th Place: 1940, 1945, 1946, 1952
Soviet Cup:
 Semi-Finals: 1938, 1947, 1952
Russian Cup:
 Eighth final: 2003, 2018
Russian Professional Football League
  Champion (3): 2001, 2009, 2017
City Championship:
  Champion (29): 1926–1927, 1930–1931, 1933, 1935–1936, 1938, 1945, 1948, 1950–1951, 1953, 1963–1964, 1966–1968, 1970–1978, 1980–1981, 1993
  Runner-up (1): 2019, 2020. 2021
City Cup:
  Winner (12): 1943–1944, 1948, 1950, 1969–1971, 1973, 1977–1979, 1983, 2019, 2021

See also
Saint Petersburg derby
FC Dinamo Moscow
FC Dynamo Kyiv
FC Dinamo Tbilisi
Dynamo Sports Club
Petrovsky Stadium

References

External links
Official website 
 
 
 
 

 
Football clubs in Saint Petersburg
Saint Petersburg
1922 establishments in Russia
Association football clubs established in 1922
Soviet Top League clubs